Van Gestel (also: Van Ghestel) is a Dutch toponymic surname or family name originating from North Brabant. The first use of the name stems from the 11th and 12th century, with the first recorded coat of arms dating to 1308. It is derived from the word "Gestel" and translates to "from Gestel". "Gestel" or "Ghestele" was a name for a higher area between two river valleys, and is a common name or suffix for settlements in the Southern Netherlands. Gestel can refer to several geographical locations:

Netherlands

 Gestel (Eindhoven)
 Moergestel, village (Gestel) bordering a swamp (moeras)
 Sint-Michielsgestel, named Gestel before 1629 
 Luyksgestel, village (Gestel) in former prinsbisdom Luik
 Oud Gastel, named Gestele before 1275
 Gastel, variation on Gestel

Belgium

 Gestel (Berlaar), as well as the 14th century Gestelhof castle 
 Gestel (Meerhout)
 Gestel (Lummen)
 Gestel (Meeuwen)
 Gistel, named Ghistele of Ghestele originally

France

 Gestel (Morbihan), municipality in Bretagne

Notable people with this surname include:

Van Gestel

Celine Van Gestel (born 1997), Belgian volleyball player
Dries Van Gestel (born 1994), Belgian racing cyclist
Gerrit Van Gestel (born 1958), Belgian racing cyclist
Harry van Gestel (born 1953), Dutch artist and painter
Peter van Gestel (1937–2019), Dutch writer of young adult fiction
Sophie van Gestel (born 1991), Dutch beach volleyball player
Tiest van Gestel (1881–1969), Dutch archer
Variants
Variant spellings of Gestel include Ghestel, Ghesel, Gastel, Gessel, Ghestele, Gheest, Gistel and Gaast. People with this name include:
Jean-Paul van Gastel (born 1972), Dutch football midfielder
Jo van Gastel (1887–1969), Dutch archer
Sander van Gessel (born 1976), Dutch football defender

References

Dutch-language surnames
Toponymic surnames
Surnames of Dutch origin